Ma'a Allan Nonu  (born 21 May 1982) is a professional rugby union player from New Zealand who currently plays for the San Diego Legion in Major League Rugby (MLR). He plays in the inside centre, but can also cover outside centre and wing. 

He was a key member of the All Blacks' 2011 and 2015 Rugby World Cup winning teams, becoming one of only 21 players who have won the Rugby World Cup on multiple occasions.

He is regarded as one of the greatest centres to ever play the game of rugby union.

Career

Early career
Nonu attended Strathmore Park Primary School in Wellington, then attended Rongotai College in Wellington. At club level, he represented Oriental Rongotai in the Wellington competition. He played for the Wellington Secondary Schools team in 1999–2000, and the Wellington Under 19s team in 2001. He also played rugby league as a youngster.

Professional career and the All Blacks
He made his provincial debut for Wellington in the 2002 NPC and debuted for the Hurricanes in the 2003 Super 12. He played for the New Zealand Sevens in 2004. On the back of some outstanding Super 12 form, Nonu made his Test debut for the All Blacks on 14 June 2003, starting at centre in a 15-13 loss to England.

Nonu missed selection for the 2003 Tri Nations, with the selectors preferring Umaga, Aaron Mauger and Daniel Carter in the midfield. He was selected for the All Blacks' 2003 World Cup squad and played in pool matches against Canada, Italy and Tonga. He scored his first Test try against Canada and was generally impressive on attack and easily breaking the line and his big stature was intimidating to the opposition. However, question marks over his defensive game and inexperience meant he was not selected for the knockout stage of the tournament despite an injury to Umaga.

Nonu missed selection for the Tri Nations in 2004 after a form slump in the Super 12. He forced his way back into contention playing for Wellington in the 2004 NPC, and played as a substitute in all four matches on the All Blacks' undefeated end of year tour to Europe.

Nonu played on the wing for much of the 2005 Super 12, with Conrad Smith preferred as Umaga's midfield partner. Standout performances included a hat trick against 2004 Super 12 champions the Brumbies. Nonu played at second five-eighth for the Possibles in the 2005 All Blacks trial, scoring two tries and setting up two more to inspire the Possibles to an upset win over the Probables. He played in the second Test against the 2005 British & Irish Lions as a substitute, replacing Sitiveni Sivivatu on the wing. He again missed selection for the 2005 Tri Nations.

Wellington Lions captain Umaga was rested during the 2005 NPC, and in his absence Nonu was promoted to the captaincy of the team. During the NPC, he established himself as one of New Zealand's most dangerous midfield runners. He was selected for the 2005 All Blacks Grand Slam tour, playing Tests as a substitute against Wales and Scotland, and earning his third Test start against Ireland. He was cited for an alleged spear tackle against Brian O'Driscoll during the Test against Ireland, but was later cleared of the charge.

In 2006 Nonu was ruled out of the Tri Nations squad due to injury, Mils Muliaina being chosen to take his place. He damaged the base of his left thumb playing club rugby in Wellington, which required him to have surgery. He was, however, included in the end of year tour with the All Blacks.

Due to his absence from the All Blacks Tri Nations squad, Nonu was able to play every game with the Wellington Lions in the Air New Zealand Cup, which greatly helped them. Nonu missed out on selection for the 2007 Rugby World Cup, with the selectors preferring Aaron Mauger, Luke McAlister, Conrad Smith and Isaia Toeava in the centres.

The game against Argentina on 28 September 2013 marked a record fiftieth international game in combination with Conrad Smith.

Rugby league
In December 2006, Nonu expressed a desire to switch codes to rugby league and play in the National Rugby League (NRL) after the 2007 Rugby World Cup. A move overseas was seen as more likely as he was not named in Graham Henry's 2007 squad but was instead dropped to the Junior All Blacks.

In 2008, Nonu returned to the All Blacks, starting in the majority of tests throughout the year, and regarded to be the All Blacks first choice inside centre.

2011 Tri-Nations & Rugby World Cup
Nonu played his first international of 2011 in a friendly against Fiji.

He played in New Zealand's first Tri-Nations game against South Africa. The All Blacks ended up winning 40-7. He then went on to play New Zealand's next game in the Tri-Nations against Australia where he scored the opening try. He played the final game of the tournament against Australia and scored his 21st international try.

Nonu was selected for the All Blacks  2011 Rugby World Cup. He scored the final try in the All Blacks' opening match against Tonga. On 23 October 2011, he played in the final against France, which the All Blacks won by 8-7 to become world champions.

Ricoh Black Rams
Following the 2011 Rugby World Cup, Nonu joined the Ricoh Black Rams, in Japan, on a short-term 'sabbatical'. In 12 games for the Rams, he scored six tries and received one yellow card.

Blues
On 1 July 2011, Nonu announced he had signed a two-year contract with the Blues. This was after the Hurricanes announced he would not be resigned following the 2011 Super Rugby season.

Nonu made his debut for the Blues in round three of the 2012 Super Rugby season.
2012 also marked a 'below-par' season for Nonu in terms of form and his struggle to return to the No. 12 jersey for the All Blacks. Nonu's performances following his return from his Black Rams sabbatical were met with poor response  and subsequently led to his exclusion from the match-day 22 for the France test series. Nonu's place was filled by Sonny Bill Williams, whose form and consistency kept Nonu out of the 12 jersey until Week 3 of the 2012 Rugby Championship. Due to injury to former Hurricanes teammate Conrad Smith, Nonu returned to the All Blacks starting lineup in the first week of the inaugural Rugby Championship at 13, centre, with Sonny Bill at 12, forming what was considered the most 'destructive' centre pairing in world rugby.

Nonu returned to the All Blacks number 12 jersey. Following Williams' departure to Japan and then the NRL, Nonu played all but one of the remaining tests as second five-eighth, except against Scotland where he came off the bench.

Super Rugby movements
After one season in Auckland, Nonu moved to Dunedin, signing a one-year deal with the Highlanders for the 2013 Super Rugby season.

After struggling to find a Super Rugby team for 2014, (where all 5 New Zealand franchises initially stated they weren't interested in signing him), Nonu eventually turned down a lucrative offer to play for French Top 14 side Clermont, to return to the Blues for another season. In doing so, he made himself available to continue playing for the All Blacks throughout 2014 and ultimately gain selection for the Rugby World Cup the following year in England.

Nonu returned to the Hurricanes for the 2015 Super Rugby season, the team he left in 2011. It was speculated that the departure of former Hurricanes coach Mark Hammett to the Cardiff Blues paved the way for his return.

Toulon
On 20 December 2014, it was announced Nonu would be joining Top 14 side Toulon after the 2015 Rugby World Cup on a two-year deal.

2015 World Cup
Nonu was selected as the starting inside centre for the 2015 Rugby World Cup, he played in nearly every pool game. Nonu played every knockout match and scored a 50m solo try to help the All Blacks beat Australia 34-17 in the final.

In the 2016 New Year Honours, Nonu was appointed a Member of the New Zealand Order of Merit for services to rugby.

Second Blues return
Nonu signed on with the Blues for the 2019 Super Rugby season.

San Diego Legion
Major League Rugby announced in October 2019 that Nonu would play for the San Diego Legion in the 2020 season. Nonu was named captain of the San Diego Legion for the 2022 season.

Playing style
Nonu is well known for his explosiveness and powerful attacking runs and regularly breaks the defensive line at will. 2011 World Cup-winning All Blacks coach Graham Henry has described him as "probably the best linebreaker in this game in this country."

Nonu has been noted to possess a similar attacking skillset to former All Black centre Tana Umaga. Like Umaga, he is an exceptional crash ball runner who excels at breaking the line and creating space for outside backs. In 2005, Henry described Nonu as "young Tana," underlining the impression that he was being groomed as a potential successor to Umaga. This comparison has been confirmed in recent times by Wayne Smith.

Personal life
Nonu became a vegetarian while playing in France for Toulon, citing his son Michael as his motivation: "Michael, my second one, he's seven years old. When he was growing up, I was trying to feed him meat – chicken – and he never liked it. I thought 'let's try something new'. I said 'I'm not going to eat meat because I feel sorry for him enough, he'll (feel) stink. If we're going out and I'm ordering a T-bone steak and he's eating his carrots and cucumber … so I said look for the love of my son I won't eat meat because I'll try to be the same as him".  

According to Nonu, part of the reason why he had remained in good condition and fitness despite his advancing years was because he was very careful about what he ate, crediting his new diet with his resurgence playing Super Rugby for the Blues at 37 years old. "It's helped me physically and I enjoy it, you know."

Honours
:
 Member of the New Zealand Order of Merit (MNZM) (2019)

References

External links
 

Statistics from Fox Sports

New Zealand rugby union players
New Zealand international rugby union players
Rugby union centres
Rugby union wings
1982 births
Living people
New Zealand sportspeople of Samoan descent
People educated at Rongotai College
New Zealand Latter Day Saints
Blues (Super Rugby) players
Hurricanes (rugby union) players
Wellington rugby union players
Highlanders (rugby union) players
RC Toulonnais players
Expatriate rugby union players in Japan
Expatriate rugby union players in France
New Zealand expatriate sportspeople in Japan
New Zealand expatriate sportspeople in France
Black Rams Tokyo players
Rugby union players from Wellington City
Members of the New Zealand Order of Merit
San Diego Legion players
East Coast rugby union players